Manthani is an assembly constituency of Telangana Legislative Assembly, India. It is one of the 3 constituencies in Peddapalli District.

Kamanpur, Kataram, Manthani, Mahadevpur, Mutharam (Mahadevpur), Malharrao, Mutharam (Manthani), Ramagiri and Palimela are the Mandals of Karimnagar District which falls under Manthani Assembly Constituency.

Manthani Legislative Assembly is one of the segments for Peddapalli Lok Sabha Constituency.

Mandals
The Assembly Constituency presently comprises the following Mandals:

Members of Legislative Assembly

Election results

Telangana Legislative Assembly election, 2018

Telangana Legislative Assembly election, 2009

See also
 List of constituencies of Telangana Legislative Assembly

References

Assembly constituencies of Telangana
Karimnagar district